Leonid Kinskey (1893/1894 – September 8, 1998) was a Russian-born American film and television actor, best known for his role as "Sascha" in the film Casablanca (1942). His last name was sometimes spelled Kinsky.

Life and career
Kinskey was born in St. Petersburg, Russia. He started his career as a mime in various imperial theatres in Russia in the mid-1910s.  In 1921, he fled Russia for Germany. He acted on stage in Europe and South America before arriving in New York City from Rio de Janeiro, Brazil, in January 1924. He joined the road production of Al Jolson's musical Wonder Bar, and in 1926 he made an appearance in the silent film The Great Depression, although his scenes were deleted, before making his appearance in Trouble in Paradise (1932).

His looks and accent helped him gain supporting roles in several movies, including the Sylvanian "agitator" in the Marx Bros. film Duck Soup (1933). He told Aljean Harmetz, author of Round Up the Usual Suspects: The Making of Casablanca, that he was cast in his best-known role, Sascha in Casablanca, which he reportedly landed because he was a drinking buddy of star Humphrey Bogart. 

Kinskey performed in episodes on no less than three dozen television series between the 1950s and early 1970s. His first appearances on the "small screen" were in 1954 on Passport to Danger, The Spike Jones Show, and Lux Video Theater. Later, in 1962, he portrayed a visiting Soviet dignitary (with most of his dialogue in Russian) in the episode "The Good Will Tour" on the sitcom The Real McCoys.

In 1965, Kinskey was a cast member in the pilot episode of Hogan's Heroes, performing as another Soviet character, who was an allied soldier and fellow prisoner-of-war. He, however, decided not to join the cast when that series went into formal production, for he reportedly "was uncomfortable playing let's-pretend with people in Nazi garb." His final roles on television were in 1971, as a professor on the series Mayberry R.F.D.; a mortician on O'Hara, U.S. Treasury; and as a deli butcher on the sitcom The Chicago Teddy Bears.

Personal life and death
Kinskey married three times, first to Josephine Tankus from 1930 until her death in 1939. Four years later he married actress Iphigenie Castiglioni, a union that lasted until her death in 1963. His final marriage, in 1985 in New York, was to Tina York, who was 38 years his junior. They remained wed until 1998, when Kinskey died in Fountain Hills, Arizona from complications of a stroke.

Filmography

Film

The Big Broadcast (1932) as Ivan
Trouble in Paradise (1932) as Russian Visitor (uncredited)
Storm at Daybreak (1933) as Serbian Villager (uncredited)
Duck Soup (1933) as Agitator 
Girl Without a Room (1933) as Gallopsky
The Cat and the Fiddle (1934) as Hans - Conservatory Violinist (uncredited)
Manhattan Melodrama (1934) as Trotskyite Slapping Poppa Rosen (uncredited)
Change of Heart (1934) as Party Guest (uncredited)
Strictly Dynamite (1934) as Garçon (uncredited)
Hollywood Party (1934) as Jake the Cabbie (uncredited)
Fugitive Road (1934) as Nicholas Petrovich,- Smuggler
Straight Is the Way (1934) as Mechanic (uncredited)
The Merry Widow (1934) as Shepherd (uncredited)
Marie Galante (1934) as Arohnson (uncredited)
We Live Again (1934) as Simon Kartinkin 
The Lives of a Bengal Lancer (1935) as Snake Charmer (uncredited)
The Gilded Lily (1935) as Vocal Teacher (uncredited)
Les Misérables (1935) as Genflou
Goin' to Town (1935) as Cecil - Interior Decorator (uncredited)
I Live My Life (1935) as Waiter (uncredited)
Peter Ibbetson (1935) as Prisoner (uncredited)
Three Godfathers (1936) as Card Player (uncredited)
The Road to Glory (1936) as Wounded Soldier
Rhythm on the Range (1936) as Mischa
A Son Comes Home (1936) as Hoodlum (uncredited)
The General Died at Dawn (1936) as Stewart
The Big Broadcast of 1937 (1936) as Russian (uncredited)
The Garden of Allah (1936) as Voluble Arab (uncredited)
Love on the Run (1936) as Man on Train (uncredited)
We're on the Jury (1937) as Professor Nicholas Krakin
Espionage (1937) as Maxie Burgos
Maytime (1937) as Student in Bar (uncredited)
The Woman I Love (1937) (uncredited)
Cafe Metropole (1937) as Artist
The Girl from Scotland Yard (1937) as Mischa
Married Before Breakfast (1937) as Mischa Lapidoff (uncredited)
Meet the Boyfriend (1937) as Dr. Sokoloff
Make a Wish (1937) as Moe
One Hundred Men and a Girl (1937) as Pianist at Mrs. Frost's Party (uncredited)
The Sheik Steps Out (1937) as Allusi Ali
My Dear Miss Aldrich (1937) as A Waiter
Nothing Sacred (1937) as Ferdinand Roassare - Poet (uncredited)
Wise Girl (1937) as Eccentric Greenwich Village Writer (uncredited)
Outside of Paradise (1938) as Cafe Owner Ivan Petrovich
The Big Broadcast of 1938 (1938) as Ivan (uncredited)
A Trip to Paris (1938) as Emile
Three Blind Mice (1938) as Young Man
Professor Beware (1938) as Tableau Director (uncredited)
Algiers (1938) as L'Arbi
The Great Waltz (1938) as Dudelman
Flirting with Fate (1938) as Pedro Lopez
The Story of Vernon and Irene Castle (1939) as Artist
Exile Express (1939) as David
The Spellbinder (1939) as Harry Beldon - Saxophone Player
On Your Toes (1939) as Ivan Boultonoff
Day-Time Wife (1939) as Coco
Everything Happens at Night (1939) as Groder
He Stayed for Breakfast (1940) as Comrade Nicky
Down Argentine Way (1940) as Tito Acuna
So Ends Our Night (1941) as The Chicken
That Night in Rio (1941) as Pierre
Broadway Limited (1941) as Ivan
Week-End in Havana (1941) as Rafael
Ball of Fire (1941) as Prof. Quintana
Lady for a Night (1942) as Boris
Brooklyn Orchid (1942) as Ignatz Rachkowsky
I Married an Angel (1942) as Zinski
The Talk of the Town (1942) as Jan Pulaski
Somewhere I'll Find You (1942) as Dorloff (uncredited)
Casablanca (1942) as Sacha
Cinderella Swings It (1943) as Vladimir Smitkin
Let's Have Fun (1943) as Gregory Loosnikoff
El circo (1943) as Cliente ruso zapatero 
Presenting Lily Mars (1943) as Leo
Gildersleeve on Broadway (1943) as Window Washer
Five Were Chosen (1944)
The Fighting Seabees (1944) as Johnny Novasky
That's My Baby! (1944) as Doctor Svatsky
Can't Help Singing (1944) as Koppa
Monsieur Beaucaire (1946) as Rene
Alimony (1949) as Joe Wood
The Great Sinner (1949) as Bandleader in Park (uncredited)
Nancy Goes to Rio (1950) as Ivan Putroff (uncredited)
Honeychile (1951) as Chick Lister
Gobs and Gals (1952) as Ivan
The Man with the Golden Arm (1955) as Dominiwski
Glory (1956) as Vasily
The Helen Morgan Story (1957) as Stanislausky - Accordion Player (uncredited)

Television

References

External links

 
 
 
 
 

Year of birth uncertain
1998 deaths
20th-century American male actors
American male film actors
Male actors from Saint Petersburg
Russian Christians
Russian male film actors
Russian male television actors
White Russian emigrants to the United States